James Allison Hayes (born December 21, 1946) is an American politician and lawyer. He is a Republican from Louisiana.

Background

Born in Lafayette, Hayes graduated from the University of Louisiana at Lafayette (then the University of Southwestern Louisiana). He served in the Louisiana Air National Guard from 1968 to 1974.

Career

In 1986, Hayes was elected to the United States House of Representatives as a Democrat to fill the seat vacated by John Berlinger Breaux, the candidate instead elected to succeed the retiring U.S. Senator Russell B. Long. Hayes led five opponents in the nonpartisan blanket primary, including fellow Democrats Margaret Lowenthal of Lake Charles and James David Cain of Dry Creek in Beauregard Parish, both of whom were state representatives, and a Republican, David Thibodaux of Lafayette. In the general election, Hayes defeated Lowenthal, who had narrowly led Cain for the second position in the second round of balloting.

In 1990, Hayes again defeated David Thibodaux. The tally was 103,308 (58 percent) for Hayes, 68,430 (38 percent) for Thibodaux, and 7,364 (4 percent) for another Democrat, Johnny Myers.

In 1992, Hayes as a Democrat defeated his own brother, Fredric Hayes, a Republican, with whom he had quarreled. Hayes received 84,149 (73 percent) to his brother's 23,870 (21 percent). A second Republican, Robert J. "Bob" Nain, polled 7,184 votes (6 percent).

In 1994, Hayes defeated a comeback bid by former Congressman Clyde C. Holloway of Forest Hill in Rapides Parish, Holloway's Louisiana's 8th congressional district having been eliminated and dismembered after the 1990 United States Census. Hayes polled 72,424 votes (53 percent) to Holloway's 54,253 (40 percent). Another 7 percent of voters supported a candidate who ran as "No Party." In that same election, Hayes' former rival, David Thibodaux, was elected without opposition to the Lafayette Parish School Board.

Hayes left the Democrats on December 1, 1995, and joined the Republicans. He was one of several Conservative Democratic lawmakers, mostly from the South, including Nathan Deal of Georgia, Mike Parker of Mississippi, Greg Laughlin of Texas and fellow Louisianan Billy Tauzin, to switch to the Republican party during that time, as the Republicans had taken majorities in Congress in the 1994 elections. Hayes then ran for the United States Senate in 1996. He finished fifth in the nonpartisan blanket primary with almost 72,000 votes (6 percent). Republican Louis E. "Woody" Jenkins of Baton Rouge and Democrat Mary Landrieu of New Orleans then advanced to the tightly contested general election, which Landrieu narrowly won under protest.

In 1997, when Hayes retired from the House after unsuccessfully running for the Senate, his House seat was taken by Democrat Chris John of Crowley in Acadia Parish.

Hayes continues to be politically involved as a lobbyist.  He appeared at a December 2008 event to raise funds for the successful reelection in 2010 of Republican U.S. Senator David Vitter.

See also

 List of American politicians who switched parties in office
 List of United States representatives who switched parties

References

External links
 

1946 births
Living people
University of Louisiana at Lafayette alumni
Louisiana Republicans
Louisiana lawyers
American lobbyists
Members of the Louisiana House of Representatives
Politicians from Lafayette, Louisiana
Republican Party members of the United States House of Representatives
Democratic Party members of the United States House of Representatives from Louisiana
Members of Congress who became lobbyists